The 2021 Grote Prijs Jef Scherens was the 54th edition of the Grote Prijs Jef Scherens road cycling one day race in and around Leuven. It was held on 15 August 2021 as a 1.1 categorised race and was part of the 2021 UCI Europe Tour and the 2021 Belgian Road Cycling Cup. The race course overlaps to a large part with that of the 2021 UCI Road World Championships, which are to be held a few weeks later.

The defending champion is sprinter Niccolò Bonifazio, who won the 2019 edition as no race was held in 2020 due to the COVID-19 pandemic in Belgium. Besides Bonifazio, other sprinters present included Tim Merlier, Baptiste Planckaert, Nacer Bouhanni and Bryan Coquard. It was won by the defending champion Bonifazio in the sprint.

Teams
Twenty-two teams were invited to take part in the race. These included one UCI World Tour team, six UCI Professional Continental teams, and fifteen UCI Continental teams.

Result

References

External links

Grote Prijs Jef Scherens
2021 UCI Europe Tour
2021 in Belgian sport